Coelioxys hunteri is a species of hymenopteran in the family Megachilidae.

References

Further reading

External links

 

hunteri
Insects described in 1914